Syllepte favillacealis is a moth in the family Crambidae. It was described by Snellen in 1899. It is found in Indonesia (Java).

References

Moths described in 1899
favillacealis
Moths of Indonesia